Tebogo Pholoso Moerane (born 7 April 1995) is a South African soccer player who plays as a defender. He represented South Africa in the football competition at the 2016 Summer Olympics.

Born in Mookgophong, he has played in the South African Premier Division for Bidvest Wits, Black Leopards and Royal AM, and in the second tier for Baroka.

References

1995 births
Living people
South African soccer players
South African Premier Division players
National First Division players
Bidvest Wits F.C. players
Black Leopards F.C. players

Baroka F.C. players
Footballers at the 2016 Summer Olympics
Olympic soccer players of South Africa
Association football defenders
People from Waterberg District Municipality
Soccer players from Limpopo